Lebanon is a city in and the county seat of Laclede County in Missouri. The population was 14,474 at the time of the 2010 census. It is the county seat of Laclede County. The Lebanon Micropolitan Statistical Area consists of Laclede County.

History
Lebanon was founded in 1849. The community was named after Lebanon, Tennessee, the former home of many of the first settlers.

Lebanon had many motels for travelers along Route 66.

The Ralph E. Burley House, Joe Knight Building, Laclede County Jail, Ploger-Moneymaker Place, and Wallace House are listed on the National Register of Historic Places.

Geography

Climate

Demographics

2010 census
As of the census of 2010, there were 14,474 people, 5,980 households, and 3,745 families living in the city. The racial makeup of the city was 94.1% White, 1.3% African American, 0.6% Native American, 0.7% Asian, 0.1% Pacific Islander, 0.7% from other races, and 2.4% from two or more races. Hispanic or Latino of any race were 2.6% of the population.

There were 5,980 households, of which 34.0% had children under the age of 18 living with them, 43.6% were married couples living together, 13.7% had a female householder with no husband present, 5.3% had a male householder with no wife present, and 37.4% were non-families. 31.8% of all households were made up of individuals, and 14.3% had someone living alone who was 65 years of age or older. The average household size was 2.36 and the average family size was 2.94.

The median age in the city was 35.4 years. 25.9% of residents were under the age of 18; 9.7% were between the ages of 18 and 24; 25.9% were from 25 to 44; 22.5% were from 45 to 64; and 15.8% were 65 years of age or older. The gender makeup of the city was 47.5% male and 52.5% female.

2000 census
As of the census of 2000, there were 12,155 people, 5,132 households, and 3,181 families living in the city. The population density was 891.9 people per square mile (344.3/km2). There were 5,745 housing units at an average density of 421.6 per square mile (162.7/km2). The racial makeup of the city was 95.99% White, 0.90% African American, 0.54% Native American, 0.50% Asian, 0.03% Pacific Islander, 0.42% from other races, and 1.61% from two or more races. Hispanic or Latino of any race were 1.65% of the population.

There were 5,132 households, out of which 30.6% had children under the age of 18 living with them, 45.8% were married couples living together, 12.3% had a female householder with no husband present, and 38.0% were non-families. 33.4% of all households were made up of individuals, and 16.6% had someone living alone who was 65 years of age or older. The average household size was 2.30 and the average family size was 2.91.

In the city, the population was spread out, with 25.2% under the age of 18, 10.1% from 18 to 24, 27.4% from 25 to 44, 19.5% from 45 to 64, and 17.9% who were 65 years of age or older. The median age was 36 years. For every 100 females, there were 88.2 males. For every 100 females age 18 and over, there were 82.9 males.

The median income for a household in the city was $27,668, and the median income for a family was $36,509. Males had a median income of $27,657 versus $17,509 for females. The per capita income for the city was $16,636. About 12.3% of families and 15.2% of the population were below the poverty line, including 17.4% of those under age 18 and 18.0% of those age 65 or over.

Education
Public education in Lebanon is administered by Lebanon R-III School District, which operates Lebanon High School.

The Lebanon Senior High School Girls Wrestling Team is notable for winning the inaugural MSHSAA State Girls Wrestling Championship in 2019, the first 1st place title in the school’s history.

Lebanon has a public library, the Lebanon–Laclede County Library.

Notable people
Richard P. Bland, congressman from the state of Missouri
Jim Bohannon, radio news and talk show host
Ernest R. Breech, business executive
Justin Britt, lineman for Houston Texans
Cynthia Coffman, 38th Attorney General of Colorado
Phil M. Donnelly, 41st and 43rd governor of Missouri
Michael S. Hopkins, NASA astronaut and Air Force colonel
Jeff Knight, member of the Missouri House of Representatives
Antoine Predock, architect and designer
Jerry Schoonmaker, professional baseball player for the Washington Senators
William Tecumseh Vernon, educator, minister and bishop
Betty Wagoner, professional baseball player for the South Bend Blue Sox
Lanford Wilson, playwright and winner of the Pulitzer Prize for drama
Harold Bell Wright, author

See also
Lebanon I-44 Speedway

References

External links
 City of Lebanon
 Lebanon Area Chamber of Commerce
 Historic maps of Lebanon in the Sanborn Maps of Missouri Collection at the University of Missouri

1849 establishments in Missouri
Cities in Laclede County, Missouri
Cities in Missouri
County seats in Missouri